Arthur Harold Stone (30 September 1916 – 6 August 2000) was a British mathematician born in London, who worked at the universities of Manchester and Rochester, mostly in topology. His wife was American mathematician Dorothy Maharam.

Stone studied at Trinity College, Cambridge. His first paper dealt with squaring the square, he proved the Erdős–Stone theorem with Paul Erdős and is credited with the discovery of the first two flexagons, a trihexaflexagon and a hexahexaflexagon while he was a student at Princeton University in 1939. His Ph.D. thesis, Connectedness and Coherence, was written in 1941 under the direction of Solomon Lefschetz. He served as a referee for The American Mathematical Monthly journal in the 1980s.

The Stone metrization theorem has been named after him, and he was a member of a group of mathematicians who published pseudonymously as Blanche Descartes. He is not to be confused with American mathematician Marshall Harvey Stone.

See also
Ham sandwich theorem

References

External links 
 

1916 births
2000 deaths
20th-century American mathematicians
20th-century English mathematicians
Alumni of Trinity College, Cambridge
British expatriate academics in the United States
English expatriates in the United States
Topologists
Mathematicians from London
Princeton University alumni